Oakleigh is an unincorporated community in Dauphin County, Pennsylvania. It is  part of the Harrisburg–Carlisle metropolitan statistical area.

Oakleigh is located on the intersection of Fortieth Street (Francis L. Cadden Parkway) and Derry Street in Swatara Township.

References

External links 
Oakleigh Profile
Swatara Township Map

Harrisburg–Carlisle metropolitan statistical area
Unincorporated communities in Dauphin County, Pennsylvania
Unincorporated communities in Pennsylvania